Henry Ossawa Tanner (June 21, 1859 – May 25, 1937) was an American artist and the first African-American painter to gain international acclaim. Tanner moved to Paris, France, in 1891 to study at the Académie Julian and gained acclaim in French artistic circles. His painting Daniel in the Lions' Den (1895, location unknown) was accepted into the 1896 Salon, the official art exhibition of the Académie des Beaux-Arts in Paris. Tanner's Resurrection of Lazarus (1896, Musée d'Orsay, Paris) was purchased by the French government after winning the third-place medal at the 1897 Salon. In 1923, the French government elected Tanner chevalier of the Legion of Honor. 

After pursuing art on his own as a young man, Tanner enrolled at the Pennsylvania Academy of the Fine Arts in Philadelphia in 1879. The only black student, he became a favorite of the painter Thomas Eakins, who had recently started teaching there. Tanner made other connections among artists, including Robert Henri. In the late 1890s, art patron Rodman Wanamaker sponsored Tanner's trip to the Mutasarrifate of Jerusalem after seeing the artist's paintings of biblical themes.

Tanner married Jessie Macauley Olssen on December 14, 1899, in London. Their son, Jesse Ossawa Tanner, was born in New York City on September 25, 1903. The family made France their permanent home, dividing time between Paris and a farm in Normandy.

Early life

Henry Ossawa Tanner was born in Pittsburgh, Pennsylvania, the first of nine children; two brothers, Benjamin and Horace, died in infancy. One of his sisters, Halle Tanner Dillon Johnson, was the first woman to be certified to practice medicine in Alabama. His parents gave him a middle name that commemorated the struggle at Osawatomie between pro- and anti-slavery partisans. His father Benjamin Tucker Tanner (1835–1923) became a bishop in the African Methodist Episcopal Church (AME), the first independent black denomination in the United States. He was educated at Avery College and Western Theological Seminary in Pittsburgh, and developed a literary career. In addition, he was a political activist, supporting abolition of slavery. Henry Tanner's mother Sarah was born into slavery in Virginia, but had escaped as a refugee to the North via the Underground Railroad. There she met and married Benjamin Tanner.

The family moved from Pittsburgh to Philadelphia when Tanner was a teenager. There his father became a friend of Frederick Douglass, sometimes supporting him, sometimes criticizing. Robert Douglass, Jr., a successful black artist in Philadelphia, was an early neighbor of the Tanner family,  and Tanner wrote that he "used to pass and always stopped to look at his pictures in the window."  When Tanner was about 13 years old, he saw a landscape painter working in Fairmount Park, where he was walking with his father. He decided that he wanted to be a painter.

Education

Although many artists refused to accept an African-American apprentice, in 1879 Tanner enrolled at the Pennsylvania Academy of the Fine Arts in Philadelphia, becoming the only black student. His decision to attend the school came at a time when art academies increasingly focused on study from live models rather than plaster casts. Thomas Eakins, a professor at the Pennsylvania Academy, was one of the first American artists to promote new approaches to artistic education including increased study from live models, discussion of anatomy in classes of both male and female students, and dissections of cadavers to teach anatomy. Eakins's progressive approach to art education had a profound effect on Tanner. The young artist was one of Eakins' favorite students; two decades after Tanner left the Academy,  Eakins painted his portrait.

At the Academy, Tanner befriended artists with whom he kept in contact throughout the rest of his life, most notably Robert Henri, one of the founders of the Ashcan School. During a relatively short time at the Academy, Tanner developed a thorough knowledge of anatomy and the skill to express his understanding of the weight and structure of the human figure on the canvas.

Tanner's artistic studies were disrupted by illness, which was reported in November 1881 and said to have persisted into the following summer, when Tanner spent time recovering in the Adirondack mountains.

Issues of racism

Although Tanner gained confidence as an artist and began to sell his work, he faced racism working as a professional artist in Philadelphia. In his autobiography, The Story of an Artist's Life, Tanner described the burden of racism:

I was extremely timid and to be made to feel that I was not wanted, although in a place where I had every right to be, even months afterwards caused me sometimes weeks of pain.  Every time any one of these disagreeable incidents came into my mind, my heart sank, and I was anew tortured by the thought of what I had endured, almost as much as the incident itself.

Life abroad

In the hope of earning enough money to travel to Europe, Tanner operated a photography studio in Atlanta during the late 1880s. The venture was unsuccessful. During this period Tanner met Bishop Joseph Crane Hartzell, a trustee of Clark College. Hartzell and his wife befriended Tanner, became his patrons, and recommended him for a teaching job at the college. Tanner taught drawing at Clark College (now Clark Atlanta University) for a short period.

In 1891, he traveled to Paris, France, to study at the Académie Julian. He also joined the American Art Students Club. Paris was a welcome escape for Tanner; within French art circles, race mattered little. Tanner acclimated quickly to Parisian life. There he met Atherton Curtis who became a friend and a patron of his art.

He was part of a community of artists in Mount Kisco, New York for six months in 1902, at the behest of Curtis, and returned the following winter. Except for occasional brief returns home, Tanner spent the rest of his life in Paris. There he was introduced to many new artists whose works would affect his approach to art. At the Louvre, he encountered and studied the works of Gustave Courbet, Jean-Baptiste Chardin and Louis Le Nain. These artists had painted scenes of ordinary people in their environment, and the influence in Tanner's work is noticeable. That of Courbet's The Stone Breakers (1850; destroyed) can be seen in the similarities in Tanner's The Young Sabot Maker (1895). Both paintings explore the themes of apprenticeship and manual labor.

Tanner continued his studies under renowned artists such as Jean Joseph Benjamin Constant and Jean-Paul Laurens. With their guidance, Tanner began to establish a reputation in France. He settled at the Étaples art colony in Normandy. 

Earlier, Tanner had painted marine scenes of man's struggle with the sea, but by 1895 he was creating mostly religious works. His shift to painting biblical scenes occurred as he was undergoing a spiritual struggle. In a letter he wrote to his parents on Christmas 1896, he stated, "I have made up my mind to serve Him [God] more faithfully." A transitional work from this period is the recently rediscovered painting of a fishing boat tossed on the waves, which is held by the Smithsonian American Art Museum.

This is based on the description of a miracle in the Gospel of Matthew in which "the boat was now in the middle of the sea, tossed by the waves, for the wind was contrary" (14:24). The simple resources at Étaples were well adapted to his subject matter, which in several cases featured biblical figures in dark interiors.

Tanner's painting Daniel in the Lions' Den was accepted into the 1896 Salon. Later that year he painted The Resurrection of Lazarus. The critical praise for this piece solidified Tanner's position in the artistic elite and heralded the future direction of his paintings, which treated mostly biblical themes. Upon seeing The Resurrection of Lazarus, art critic Rodman Wanamaker offered to pay all the expenses for a journey by Tanner to the Middle East. Wanamaker felt that any serious painter of biblical scenes needed to see the environment firsthand and that a painter of Tanner's caliber was well worth the investment.

Tanner quickly accepted the offer. Before the next Salon opened, he set forth for the Palestine region of the Levant. Explorations of various mosques and biblical sites, as well as character studies of the local population, allowed him to further his artistic training. His paintings developed a powerful air of mystery and spirituality. Tanner was not the first artist to study the Middle East in person: since the 1830s, interest in Orientalism had been growing in Europe. Artists such as Eugène Delacroix, David Roberts and, later, Henri Matisse made such tours to capitalize on this curiosity.

In his adopted home of France, in 1923 Tanner was appointed Chevalier of the Legion of Honor, the highest national order of merit. He considered this "citation by the French government to be the greatest honor of his illustrious career."

The Banjo Lesson

On a short return visit to the United States in 1893, Tanner painted The Banjo Lesson, while in Philadelphia. Considered his most well-known work, the painting shows an elderly black man teaching a boy, assumed to be his grandson, how to play the banjo. This quiet composition explores several important themes. The image of a black man playing the banjo appears throughout American art of the late 19th century. Thomas Worth, Willy Miller, Walter M. Dunk, Eastman Johnson, and Tanner's teacher Thomas Eakins had all tackled the subject in their artwork.

Tanner created a sensitive moment of human interaction. The old man and young boy are shown engaged in a concentrated activity, oblivious to the rest of the world, sharing a sense of contact and cooperation. Tanner portrays the sitters as individuals with portrait-like detail. 

Tanner's muted palette creates a peaceful scene that emphasizes modesty and family. There are two separate and varying light sources: A natural white, blue glow from outside enters from the left, while the warm light from a fireplace is apparent on the right. The figures are illuminated where the two light sources meet; some have hypothesized this as a manifestation of Tanner's situation in transition between two worlds, his American past and his newfound home in France.

Painting style

Tanner painted landscapes, religious subjects, and scenes of daily life in a realistic style that echoed that of Eakins. While works like The Banjo Lesson depicted everyday scenes of African American life, Tanner later painted religious subjects. It is likely that Tanner's father, a minister in the African Methodist Episcopal Church, was a formative influence for him.

Tanner was not limited to one specific approach to painting and drawing. His works reflect at times meticulous attention to detail and loose, expressive brushstrokes in others. Often both methods are employed simultaneously. Tanner was also interested in the effects that color could have in a painting.   Warmer compositions such as The Resurrection of Lazarus (1896) and The Annunciation (1898) express the intensity and fire of religious moments, and the elation of transcendence between the divine and humanity. Other paintings emphasize cool hues, which became dominant in his work after the mid-1890s. A palette of indigo and turquoise—referred to as the "Tanner blues"—characterizes works such as The Three Marys (1910), Gateway (1912) and The Arch (1919). Works such as The Good Shepherd (1903) and Return of the Holy Women (1904) evoke a feeling of somber religiosity and introspection. 

Tanner often experimented with light in his works, which at times adds symbolic meaning. In The Annunciation (1898), for example, the archangel Gabriel is represented as a column of light that forms, together with the shelf in the upper left corner, a cross.

Marriage and family

In 1899 he married Jessie Olsson, a Swedish-American opera singer. A contemporary, Virginia Walker Course, described their relationship as one of equal talents, but racist attitudes insisted the relationship was unequal:

Fan, did you ever hear of a miss [sic] Olsson of Portland? She has a beautiful voice I believe and came to Paris to cultivate it and she has married a darkey artist ... He is an awefully [sic] talented man but he is black. ... She seems like a well educated girl and really very nice but it makes me sick to see a cultivated woman marry a man like that. I don't know his work but he is very talented they say.

Jessie Tanner died in 1925, twelve years before her husband, and he grieved her deeply through the 1920s. He sold the family home in Les Charmes where they had been so happy together. They are buried next to each other in Sceaux, Hauts-de-Seine.

They had a son, Jesse, who survived Tanner at his death.

Later years

During World War I, Tanner worked for the Red Cross Public Information Department, during which time he also painted images from the front lines of the war. His works featuring African-American troops were rare during the war. In 1923 the French state made him a knight of the Legion of Honour for his work as an artist.

Tanner met with fellow African-American artist Palmer Hayden in Paris circa 1927. They discussed artistic technique and he gave Hayden advice on interacting with French society.

Several of Tanner's paintings were purchased by Atlanta art collector J. J. Haverty, who founded Haverty Furniture Co. and was instrumental in establishing the High Museum of Art. Tanner's Étaples Fisher Folk is among several paintings from the Haverty collection now in the High Museum's permanent collection.

Tanner died peacefully at his home in Paris, France, on May 25, 1937. He is buried at Sceaux Cemetery in Sceaux, Hauts-de-Seine, which is a suburb of Paris.

Legacy

Tanner's work was influential during his career; he has been called "the greatest African American painter to date." The early paintings of William Edouard Scott, who studied with Tanner in France, show the influence of Tanner's technique.  In addition, some of Norman Rockwell's illustrations deal with the same themes and compositions that Tanner pursued.  Rockwell's proposed cover of the Literary Digest in 1922, for example, shows an older black man playing the banjo for his grandson.  The light sources are nearly identical to those in Tanner's Banjo Lesson.  A fireplace illuminates the right side of the picture, while natural light enters from the left.  Both use similar objects as well such as the clothing, chair, crumpled hat on the floor. Some other major artists Tanner mentored include William A. Harper and Hale Woodruff.

Tanner's Sand Dunes at Sunset, Atlantic City (c. 1885; oil on canvas) hangs in the Green Room at the White House; it is the first painting by an African-American artist to have been purchased for the permanent collection of the White House. The painting is a landscape with a "view across the cool gray of a shadowed beach to dunes made pink by the late afternoon sunlight. A low haze over the water partially hides the sun."  It was bought for $100,000 by the White House Endowment Fund during the Bill Clinton administration from Dr. Rae Alexander-Minter, grandniece of the artist.

His correspondence with Curtis between 1904 and 1937 is held at the Smithsonian Institution.

Tanner's work was included in the 2015 exhibition We Speak: Black Artists in Philadelphia, 1920s-1970s at the Woodmere Art Museum.

Exhibitions

 1972: The Art of Henry Ossawa Tanner. Glen Falls, New York: The Hyde Collection.
 1972: 19th Century American Landscape. New York: Metropolitan Museum of Art.
 1976: Two Centuries of Black American Art. Los Angeles County Museum of Art.
 1989: Black Art Ancestral Legacy: The African Impulse in African-American Art. Dallas Museum of Art.
 1993: Revisiting the White City: American Art at the 1893 World's Fair
 2010: Henry Ossawa Tanner and his Contemporaries, Des Moines Art Center (December–February 2011).
 2012: Henry Ossawa Tanner: Modern Spirit, Pennsylvania Academy of the Fine Arts, Philadelphia (January–April), then to Cincinnati Art Museum (May–September) and to Houston Museum of Fine Arts (October–January 2013)

Selected works

 Seascape-Jetty (c. 1876–78)
 Pomp at the Zoo (1880). Private Collection
 Joachim Leaving the Temple (c. 1882–1888). Baltimore Museum of Art
 Sand Dunes at Sunset, Atlantic City (1886). Estate of Sadie T. M. Alexander (On permanent display at the White House)
 The Banjo Lesson (1893). Hampton University Museum, Virginia
 The Thankful Poor (1894). Art Bridges
 The Young Sabot Maker (1895). The Nelson-Atkins Museum of Art, Kansas City, Missouri
 Daniel in the Lions' Den (1895). Los Angeles County Museum of Art
 The Resurrection of Lazarus (1896). Musée d'Orsay, Paris
 Bishop Benjamin Tucker Tanner (1897). Baltimore Museum of Art
 Lions in the Desert (c. 1897–1900). Smithsonian American Art Museum
 The Annunciation (1898). Philadelphia Museum of Art, W.P. Wilstach Collection
 Moonlight Landscape (1898–1900). Muscarelle Museum of Art, Williamsburg, VA.
 Boy and Sheep Lying under a Tree (1881). Private Collection (On display at the Philadelphia Museum of Art)
 The Good Shepherd (1903). Jane Voorhees Zimmerli Art Museum, Rutgers University
 Return of the Holy Women (1904). Cedar Rapids Art Gallery, Iowa
 Two Disciples at the Tomb (1905–06). Art Institute of Chicago
 The Visitation (1909-10). Kalamazoo Institute of Arts
 The Holy Family (1909–10). Muskegon Museum of Art, Michigan, Hackley Picture Fund
 Moroccan Scene (about 1912). Birmingham Museum of Art, Alabama
 Palace of Justice, Tangier (1912–13). Smithsonian American Art Museum
 Scene in Cairo. Mabee-Gerrer Museum of Art, Shawnee, Oklahoma

Other works

See also
 African American art
 List of Orientalist artists
 Orientalism
 Realism (arts)

References

External links

 White House Biography
 Springfield Museum of Art Biography
 Ebony Society of Philatelic Events and Reflections Biography
 Muskegon Museum of Art
 Profile at PBS.org
 Henry Ossawa Tanner: Modern Spirit (University of California Press, 2012)—the most complete scholarly publication to date produced in conjunction with the Pennsylvania Academy of Fine Arts (PAFA), Tanner's alma mater
 Biographical sketch and gallery at the Smithsonian American Art Museum

 Art online
 Moroccan Scene at the Birmingham Museum of Art
 Joachim Leaving the Temple (c. 1882–1888)—Baltimore Museum of Art E-Museum
 Bishop Benjamin Tucker Tanner (1897)—Baltimore Museum of Art E-Museum

Archives of American Art
 Henry Ossawa Tanner Papers
 Alexander family papers relating to Henry Ossawa Tanner, 1912–1985
 Gallery of images and letters from the PAFA archives 
Henry Ossawa Tanner papers, 1860s–1978, bulk 1890–1937. Archives of American Art, Smithsonian Institution.

1859 births
1937 deaths
19th-century American painters
19th-century male artists
20th-century American painters
African-American painters
Académie Julian alumni
American expatriates in France
American male painters
American realist painters
Artists from Pittsburgh
Chevaliers of the Légion d'honneur
Christian artists
Modern painters
National Academy of Design members
Orientalist painters
Pennsylvania Academy of the Fine Arts alumni
Students of Thomas Eakins
Tanner family of Pennsylvania
African-American diaspora in Paris
American diaspora in Europe